The Chinese Ambassador to Syria is the official representative of the People's Republic of China to the Syrian Arab Republic.

List of representatives

See also
Ambassadors of the People's Republic of China

References 

 
Syria
China